The 2017–18 Duleep Trophy was the 56th season of the Duleep Trophy, a first-class cricket tournament in India. It took place between 7 and 29 September 2017, with all of the matches being played as day/night fixtures. India Blue were the defending champions.

Initially, the Board of Control for Cricket in India (BCCI) had cancelled the tournament because of fixture congestion in both India's domestic and international calendar, but it was restored shortly after the original announcement. India Red qualified for the final, after winning their first game and drawing the second. The final round-robin match between India Blue and India Green ended in a draw, after three of the four days were washed out with no play possible. India Blue progressed to the final, as a result of their earlier drawn game against India Red. India Red won the tournament by beating India Blue by 163 runs in the final.

Squads

Abhinav Mukund was unavailable because of dengue fever. Akhil Herwadkar replaced him on the India Red squad. Ambati Rayudu was unavailable for the tournament because of knee injury. Prithvi Shaw replaced him in India Red's squad. Siddarth Kaul, who was initially named in India Green, was picked by India Red as an injury replacement. Krishnappa Gowtham was left out of the squad. Priyank Panchal, Sudip Chatterjee, Rishabh Pant and Karn Sharma were released from India Red's squad for the India A series. Suryakumar Yadav and Washington Sundar were added to the India Red squad.

Vijay Shankar and Jayant Yadav were unavailable due to injuries. Akshay Wakhare and Pankaj Rao were named as replacements. Ankit Rajpoot was released from the India Blue squad for the India A series and Pankaj Singh was added to India Blue's squad. Sagun Kamat was released from the India Blue squad ahead of finals.

Shreyas Iyer was unavailable due to injury. Varun Aaron was added to India Green's squad as cover. Kaushik Gandhi who was initially named in India Blue's squad was added to India Green's squad. Karun Nair, Ravikumar Samarth, Ankit Bawne, Shahbaz Nadeem, Navdeep Saini and Mohammed Siraj were released from India Green's squad for the India A series and Manpreet Juneja, Shivam Chaudhary, Amandeep Khare and Anupam Sanklecha were added to India Green's squad. Dhawal Kulkarni who was initially named in India Blue's squad, was added to India Green's squad.

Fixtures

Round-robin

Final

References

External links
 Series home at ESPN Cricinfo

Duleep Trophy seasons
Duleep Trophy
Duleep Trophy
Duleep Trophy Final